Downtown Troy Historic District is a national historic district located at Troy, Lincoln County, Missouri.   The district encompasses 39 contributing buildings, 1 contributing site, and 2 contributing structures in the central business district and surrounding residential area of Troy. It developed between about 1832 and 1966, and includes representative examples of Late Victorian style architecture. Notable buildings include the Sherman Cottle House (1832), St. Stephens Methodist Church (1900-1901), Lincoln County Jail/Jailer's House (1876), Sacred Heart Catholic Church (1954), Lincoln County Courthouse (1869-1870), Troy Post Office (c. 1925), Farmers & Merchants Bank / Masonic Lodge (1906), Universalist Church / Masonic Hall (1837/1851), Lincoln County Motor Co. (1929), and United Baptist Church (1937).

It was listed on the National Register of Historic Places in 2013.

References

Historic districts on the National Register of Historic Places in Missouri
Victorian architecture in Missouri
Buildings and structures in Lincoln County, Missouri
National Register of Historic Places in Lincoln County, Missouri